Boli Rural District is a rural district (dehestan) in Chavar District, Ilam County, Ilam Province, Iran. At the 2006 census, its population was 1,646, in 363 families.  The rural district has 17 villages.

See also
Sumar District
Ilam

References 

Rural Districts of Ilam Province
Ilam County